Pablo Torre is a producer, film director, and screenplay writer. He works in the cinema of Argentina.

Filmography
Director
 El Amante de las películas mudas (1994) aka The Lover of Silent Films
 La Cara del ángel (1998)
 La Mirada de Clara (2007)

Awards
Wins
 Bogota Film Festival: Silver Precolumbian Circle; for: El Amante de las películas mudas; 1995.
 Mar del Plata Film Festival: Best Screenplay; for: La Cara del ángel; 1998.

References

External links
 Interview with Pablo Torre at the Chicago Latino Film Festival
 

Argentine film directors
Argentine film producers
Argentine screenwriters
Male screenwriters
Argentine male writers
Living people
Year of birth missing (living people)
Place of birth missing (living people)